John Ware may refer to:

 John Ware (cowboy) (1845-1905), Canadian cowboy and rancher in pre-Confederation Alberta and originally from the United States
 John Ware (TV journalist), BBC journalist
 John Ware (cricketer), 19th-century athlete
 John H. Ware III (1908–1997), Republican member of the U.S. House of Representatives from Pennsylvania
 John Ware (mayor), mayor of Jeffersonville, Indiana
 John Ware (musician), drummer with First National Band
 John Ware (physician) (1795–1864), American physician and professor of medicine